Eyespot can mean:

Visual features
 Eyespot (mimicry), a color mark that looks somewhat like an eye
 Eyespot, a sensory organ of invertebrates; see simple eye in invertebrates
 Eyespot, a type of eye in some gastropods, a part of sensory organs of gastropods
 Eyespot apparatus, a photoreceptive organelle found in the flagellate (motile) cells unicellular photosynthetic organisms

Diseases
 Eyespot (wheat), a disease of wheat.
 Groundnut eyespot virus, a plant pathogenic virus

Fish species
 Eyespot gourami (Parasphaerichthys ocellatus)
 Eyespot puffer (Tetraodon biocellatus)
 Eyespot skate (Atlantoraja cyclophora)

Reptile species
 Eyespot gecko (Gonatodes ocellatus)

See also
 Floaters